Dokya is a Thai bookseller based in Bangkok and one of the largest bookstore chains in Thailand. It was the first country-wide bookstore chain in Thailand with website providing service in the Thai language. Since 2006, there have been two branches outside Thailand, at Hollywood and Chinatown in Los Angeles, US.

External links 

  Dokya website
  Dokya USA website

Bookshops of Thailand